Plesiocystiscus bubistae is a species of very small sea snail, a marine gastropod mollusk or micromollusk in the family Cystiscidae.

Description
The shell size varies between 1.5 mm and 2.3 mm.

Distribution
This species occurs in the Atlantic Ocean along the Cape Verde Archipelago.

References

Further reading 
 Coovert G. A. & Coovert H. K. (1995). "Revision of the supraspecific classification of marginelliform gastropods". The Nautilus 109(2-3): 43–110. page: 67.
 Rolán E. (2005). Malacological Fauna From The Cape Verde Archipelago. Part 1, Polyplacophora and Gastropoda

Cystiscidae
Fauna of Boa Vista, Cape Verde
Gastropods of Cape Verde
Gastropods described in 1987